The Women's madison was held on 23 October 2016. 11 teams participated over a distance of 30 km (120 laps), with sprints every 10 laps awarding 5, 3, 2 or 1 point to the first four (double in the final sprint); 20 points are also awarded/withdrawn for each lap gained/lost respectively.

Results

References

Women's madison
European Track Championships – Women's madison